Birth Control Review was a lay magazine established and edited by Margaret Sanger in 1917, three years after her friend, Otto Bobsein, coined the term "birth control" to describe voluntary motherhood or the ability of a woman to space children "in keeping with a family's financial and health resources.". Sanger published the first issue while imprisoned with Ethel Byrne, her sister, and Fannie Mindell for giving contraceptives and instruction to poor women at the Brownsville Clinic in New York. Sanger remained editor-in-chief until 1928, when she turned it over to the American Birth Control League. The last issue was published in January 1940.

History
In October 1916 Sanger opened a family planning and birth control clinic in Brownsville, New York. Sanger was arrested twice while in operation for the illegal distribution of contraceptives and for being a public nuisance. Sanger was charged with 30 days in jail where she began publishing the Birth Control Review (1917).  The predecessor to the Birth Control Review was Sanger’s previous publication titled “Woman Rebel,” a seven issue periodical running March- October 1914. This journal was the first to publish the term “birth control” in print (coined by Otto Bobsien). This would subsequently lead to the Sanger use of the term to mobilize the Birth Control movement of the 20th century.
Sanger’s brief stay in prison and its surrounding publicity launched her into martyrdom and sparked a revitalized interest in the birth control moment earning her numerous donors to support her periodical. Sanger remained editor-in-chief until 1928 when she stepped down and the American Birth Control League took over.

Content
The main goal of the Review was to increase public support for birth control by attracting the support of doctors, legislators, academics, and the middle class and wealthy society women. The BCR urged its readers join groups such as American Birth Control League (which spanned 10 different branches and later became Planned Parenthood).
Content included news of birth control activities, articles by scholars, activists, and writers on birth control, and reviews of books and other publications. The Review also included art and fiction in the form of cartoons, poetry and short stories as well as, case studies and first hand account/testimonies from women, often lower class persons of color.

Circulation
The Comstock Act of 1873 made mailing information about birth control and contraceptives illegal. Fourteen states prohibited the verbal transmission of information about contraception or abortion, while eleven others made possession of instructions for the prevention of pregnancy a criminal offense.

References

External links

Further reading 
Rachel Schreiber. “’Breed!’: the graphic satire of the Birth Control Review, in eds. Tormey and Whiteley, Art, Politics and the Pamphleteer (London: Bloomsbury, 2020), 256-273.
Lifestyle magazines published in the United States
Defunct women's magazines published in the United States
English-language magazines
Health magazines
Magazines established in 1917
Magazines disestablished in 1940
Magazines published in New York (state)
Parenting magazines